Charles Plymell (born April 26, 1935, in Holcomb, Kansas) is a poet, novelist, and small press publisher. Plymell has been published widely, collaborated with, and published many poets, writers, and artists, including principals of the Beat Generation.

He has published, printed, and designed many underground magazines and books with his wife Pamela Beach, a namesake in avant-garde publishing. He published former prisoner Ray Bremser and Herbert Huncke, whom he identified with from the hipster 1950s. He was influential in the underground comix scene, first printing Zap Comix artists such as Robert Crumb and S. Clay Wilson, whom he first published in Lawrence, Kansas.

Plymell received a citation for being a distinguished poet by Governor Joan Finney of Kansas and was cited in the 1976 World Book Encyclopedia as a most promising poet.

Biography 
Charley Douglass Plymell was born in Finney County, Kansas during the worst dust storms of that time. He was born in a converted chicken coop near Holcomb. His grandfather, Charley Plymell, was deeded a homestead in Apache Palo lands by President Grover Cleveland. The stage line began in Plymell, a few miles south of Garden City where now stands the Plymell Union Church and Pierceville-Plymell Elementary school. Like many, his face was covered by wet rags as his mother went out to shoot jackrabbits and gather cacti for meals.

His father and mother were later divorced, and his father bought a home for Charles and his sisters so they could attend school in Wichita while his father traveled. In Wichita in the 1950s Plymell dropped out of his first year at North High School, lied about his age, traveled the western states in a new car his father bought him, working on pipelines, dams, factories and riding bareback broncs and Brahma bulls in rodeos.

Returning to Wichita he became a hipster, taking peyote, marijuana, and benzedrine, the drugs of the day. He listened to jazz, R&B, and “Race music” across the tracks in Wichita. He worked at factories and took courses at Wichita State University. Allen Ginsberg credited him with creating the "Wichita Vortex." Plymell's Vortex in his own words does not relate to Ginsberg's "Wichita Vortex Sutra" but took place west of Wichita near the center of the U.S. at Space Needle Crossing in the Chalk Pyramids. His Vortex is spiritual/mythical and based on when he heard the Voice of the Game Lord, which he later authenticated through his mentor and influence, Loren Eiseley. His other influences included Hart Crane, Ezra Pound, Robert Ronnie Branaman, and Samuel Coleridge. He did not meet the Beats until 1963 when associated with Ginsberg, Neal Cassady, and William S. Burroughs. His Vortex is written about in his Tent Shaker Vortex Voice. Before that he considered himself a hipster and outsider.
 
Plymell moved to a quiet Russian neighborhood in 1962 at the corner of Haight and Ashbury in San Francisco. After the neighborhood filled with hippies and was taken over, Plymell moved to a famous flat, 1403 Gough Street. It was there at Plymell's LSD party that the Beats met the Hippies. Promptly Allen Ginsberg and Neal Cassady moved in with him where Plymell played Bob Dylan to Ginsberg for the first time.<ref>Ginsberg quote from the Martin Scorsese documentary film about Dylan, No Direction Home.</ref> It was during that time Plymell made two films that were shown at the Ann Arbor Film Festival and his collages, which opened at the "Batman Gallery" where fellow Wichitans Bob Branaman and Bruce Conner had shown. Plymell's show sold out except for a few pieces that ended up in Australia. Billy "Batman" Jahrmarkt gave Plymell his classic 1951 MGTD. His work Robert Ronnie Branaman, published in 1964, is credited with being an early example of underground comix.

Recently Plymell's book Benzedrine Highway was published by Norton Records/Kicks Books. He has been writing poems used as songs by Andrea Schroeder (Berlin); Mike Watt & Sam Dook (U.K.) They recently featured one of his songs on their CUZ tour. He has also written songs for Clubberlanggang, and is working on a book with his poems for Neal Cassady and Bob Branaman put to rockabilly by Bloodshot Bill of Norton Records.

Plymell holds an M.A. Degree in Arts and Sciences from Johns Hopkins University, 1970.

BooksApocalypse Rose, Auerhahn Press, 1967Neon Poems, Atom Mind Publications, 1970The Last of the Moccasins, City Lights Books, 1971; Mother Road Publications, 1996The Trashing of America Phase 1, Tuvoti, 1973Over the Stage of Kansas, Telephone Books, 1973The Trashing of America, Kulchur Foundation, 1975Blue Orchid Numero Uno, Telephone Books, 1977Are you a Kid?, Cherry Valley Editions, 1977Moccasins Ein Be*Cut Here, at-Kaleidoskop, Europaverlag, 1980Panik in Dodge City, Expanded Media Editions, 1983The Harder They Come, Am Here Books 1985Forever Wider, 1954–1984, Scarecrow Press, 1985Was Poe Afraid?, Bogg Publications, 1990.journals of Lysidia, Synesthesia Press, 1999Reefer Madness in the Age of Apostasy, Butcher Shop Press 2000.Hand on the Doorknob, Water Row Books, 2000in Memory of My Father, Cherry Valley Editions, 2003Cut Here, 12 Gauge Press, 2002Song for Neal Cassady, 12 Gauge Press, 2002Bennies From Heaven, 12 Gauge Press, 2002Rabid Ronnie Rap Back Jive Kansas, 1955, 12 Gauge Press, 2002Some Mothers' Sons, Cherry Valley Editions, 2004Neal and Anne on Gough Street, The Beat Scene Press, 2007News, Glass Eye Books, 2007Beginning Millenium: No More Vinyl Bush War, Glass Eye Books, 2008The Lost Poems of Charley Plymell, M Press, 2010Eat Not Thy Mind, Eye Books Ecstatic Peace Library, 2010Curricula Me Vita, Glass Eye Books/Ecstatic Peace/Cherry Valley Editions 2011Animal Light, Verlag Peter Engstler, 2012Tent Shaker Vortex Voice, Bottle of Smoke Press, 2012Benzedrine Highway, Kicks Books, 2013Planet Chernobyl, Verlag Peter Engstler, 2015Apocalypse Rose, Lenka Lente, 2015 Incognito, Ergo Sum, Ragged Lion Press, 2016

DiscographyRod McKuen Reads in Memory of My Father, Cherry Valley Editions, Vinyl, 1978.Man Overboard, Charles Plymell (Voice), The Clubber Lang Gang, CD, 2012.Blackbird by Andrea Schroeder, "Bebop Blues", Glitterhouse Records, Berlin, 2012Where The Wild Oceans End by Andrea Schroeder, "The Rattlesnake", Glitterhouse Records, Berlin, 2014Tamatebako by CUZ, "Sand and Bones", bleeding heart recordings, UK, 2014.Cuz, Mike Watt & Sam Dook, Bad Veronica, Charles Plymell (Voice), UK, 2015.Animal Light, Charles Plymell (Voice), Verlag Peter Engstler, CD, 2015Planet Chernobyl, Charles Plymell (Voice), Verlag Peter Engstler, Germany, CD, 2015Void by Andrea Schroeder, "Was Poe Afraid?" Glitterhouse Records, Berlin, 2016Apocalypse Rose, poem bilingual text; music CD by Bill Nace, Lenka Lente, Nantes, France, 2016.Bloodshot Bill Sings Charles Plymell, Feeding Tube Records and Bottle of Smoke Press, 2017.Apocalypse Rose, Charles Plymell (Voice), Bill Nace (music), openmouthrecords, 2017

AnthologiesMark in Time, New Glide Publications, San Francisco, CA, 1971.And The Roses Race Around Her Name, Stonehill, NYC, 1975.Turpentin on the Rocks, Maro Verlag, Augsburg, W. Germany, 1978.A Quois Bon, Le Soleil Noir, Paris, France, 1978.Planet Detroit, Anthology of Urban Poetry, Detroit, MI, 1983.Second Coming Anthology, Second Coming Press, San Francisco, CA, 1984.The World, Crown Publishers, 1991.Editors' Choice III, The Spirit That Moves Us, New York, 1992.The Age of Koestler, The Spirit of the Wind Press, Kalamazoo, MI, 1990.Found & Lost Magascene'', Vol. 1 / No. 0 & 1 [Contributor], Back Room/Temple of Man, 2010

References

External links
Cherry Valley Edition Website
Charles Plymell, from Kansa, Land of the Wind People, Autobiographical sketch, 12/02
Charley Plymell, from Last of the Moccasins, Vortex excerpt
Charles Plymell Collection, Wichita State University Libraries
Two Charles Plymell collections (MS 137 in Special Collections and RH MS P760 in the Kansas Collection) are housed at the Kenneth Spencer Research Library, University of Kansas
Charley Plymell portrait by Gerard Malanga, May 2010
Wichita Vortex, KTPS, Documentary, 26 February 2016
Beat Generation Poets & Artists, City Lights bookstore, August 1963, San Francisco; Photograph by Charley Plymell includes Pat Cassidy, Philip Whalen, Robert Branaman, Alan Russo, Ann Buchanan, Bob Kaufman, Allen Ginsberg, and Lawrence Ferlinghetti

Interviews 
An outsider’s inside history of the Beat Generation, as told by Charles Plymell
by Jon Randall
Interview by Catfish McDaris
Charles Plymell : The Benzedrine Highway by Paul Hawkins
Benzedrine Highway revised especially for RealityStudio, the interview now contains additional material about Plymell and William S. Burroughs by Paul Hawkins

Living people
American male poets
American publishers (people)
Beat Generation writers
1935 births
People from Finney County, Kansas